The 2006 season of the Belgian Football League (BFL) is the regular season played in the Belgium. The West Flanders Tribes won Belgian Bowl XIX against the Tournai Phoenix by a score of 23-14.

Regular season

Regular season standings
W = Wins, L = Losses, T = Ties, PCT = Winning Percentage, PF= Points For, PA = Points Against

 - clinched seed to the playoffs

Post season

References

American football in Belgium
BFL
BFL